Emily Thomas (born 19 July 1973) is an Australian snowboarder. At the 2006 Winter Olympics in Torino, Italy, she competed in the snowboard cross, placed 19th and 21st in her two qualifying runs to finish 21st out of 23 competitors, and did not qualify for the final.

References

Australian female snowboarders
Olympic snowboarders of Australia
Snowboarders at the 2006 Winter Olympics
1973 births
Living people
21st-century Australian women